Pipe Layin' Dan is the fourth solo release (and fifth album overall) by American comedian and actress LaWanda Page, released under the one-name title of LaWanda, released on Laff Records in 1973.

The album, and previous other recordings, were recorded in the years before LaWanda found mainstream success as Fred G. Sanford's (Redd Foxx) nemesis, "Aunt Esther", in the acclaimed sitcom, Sanford and Son, and featured a more raunchy and graphic LaWanda than fans of the sitcom were used to.

After her rise to fame, Laff Records released the recordings, with at least one album, Watch It, Sucka!, reaching gold status. This album includes the comic's blue comedy and her signifying "toasts" to Buccaneers and Adolf Hitler. The most famous bit on this album her extended spoken word recitation "Pipe Layin' Dan" which describes a woman named "Big Fat Funky Susie Ann", who hadn't had sex because of her homely features, until she met "Pipe Layin' Dan" who "made a dying woman live" and even "made a solid brick wall cum". She also parodies the classics, "It Had To Be You" and "Home on the Range" with raunchy lyrics.

This was LaWanda's last album until her 1979 release, Sane Advice.

Track listing
"Married Couple"
"Little Red Riding Hood"
"Daddy's Dick"
"Bustin' Cherries"
"Three M.F.'s"
"Buccaneer"
"Pedro and Rosita"
"Toast to Hitler"
"Old Grandpa"
"Don't Wanna Let Go"
"One Screw"
"It Had To Be You"
"Raise the Dead"
"TV"
"After Supper"
"Sister Smith"
"Douche Powder"
"Chew the Fat"
"All the Time"
"Home on the Range"
"Dying Whore"
"Hannah the Whore"
"Nite Shift"
"Hangin' Tree"
"Pipe Layin' Dan"

1973 albums
LaWanda Page albums
Laff Records albums